Turnerville may refer to:

Turnerville, Georgia, an unincorporated community
Turnerville, Kansas, an unincorporated community
Turnerville, Wyoming, an unincorporated community

See also
Turnersville (disambiguation)